The Elizabethan was a named passenger train operating in the United Kingdom, which ran from London King's Cross to Edinburgh Waverley station.

History
In 1953, the summer only Capitals Limited train was renamed The Elizabethan, to mark the coronation of Queen Elizabeth II. From 1954 the journey time was reduced from 6 hours 45 minutes to 6 hours 30 minutes, and it was promoted by a British Transport Film, Elizabethan Express. At the time this was the longest scheduled non-stop railway journey in the world.

The service ran until 1963 but steam haulage came to an end on 8 September 1961. On that day the final northbound run was hauled by No 60022 Mallard, which was (and remains) the holder of the world speed record for steam.

References

Named passenger trains of British Rail
Railway services introduced in 1953
1953 establishments in England